This is a list of the schools in Division II of the National Collegiate Athletic Association (NCAA) in the United States and Canada that have football as a varsity sport. In the 2023 season, there are a total of 165 Division II football programs – one more than in 2022. Change from 2022 was:
 Thomas More University began its transition to Division II, joining the Great Midwest Athletic Conference after rejoining the NCAA from the National Association of Intercollegiate Athletics (NAIA).

NCAA Division II football programs
Reclassifying institutions in yellow.

Future Division II football programs

Former Division II football programs
School names and nicknames reflect those last in use while each institution played D-II football. Name changes that do not reflect a complete change of identity (e.g., "College" to "University") are not included.

Notes

See also
NCAA Division II Football Championship
List of NCAA Division II Football Championship appearances by team
List of NCAA Division II institutions
List of NCAA Division II lacrosse programs
List of NCAA Division II men's soccer programs
List of NCAA Division II wrestling programs
List of NCAA Division I FBS football programs
List of NCAA Division I FCS football programs
List of NCAA Division III football programs
List of NAIA football programs
List of community college football programs
List of colleges and universities with club football teams
List of defunct college football teams
Collegiate Sprint Football League

References

External links

NCAA Division II Football Institutions
NCAA Division II Football Home

Football
 
NCAA Division II
Football